The 1984 United States presidential election in New Jersey took place on November 6, 1984. All 50 states and the District of Columbia, were part of the 1984 United States presidential election. Voters chose 16 electors to the Electoral College, which selected the president and vice president.

New Jersey was won by the Republican nominees, incumbent President Ronald Reagan of California and incumbent Vice President George H.W. Bush of Texas. Reagan and Bush defeated the Democratic nominees, former Vice President Walter Mondale of Minnesota and his running mate Congresswoman Geraldine Ferraro of New York.

Reagan carried New Jersey with 60.09% of the vote to Mondale’s 39.20%, a margin of 20.89%.

Reagan also swept nearly every county in the state. Mondale’s only county victory was Essex County, where he defeated Reagan 55.1%–43.5%. This remains the last election in which a Republican presidential nominee has won heavily Democratic Hudson County and Mercer County, both of which narrowly defected to Reagan in 1984 primarily due to the support of working-class Reagan Democrats. Reagan's 1.9 million votes is the most received by a Republican in a presidential election in the state's history. 

New Jersey weighed in for this election as 2.7% more Republican than the national average.

Results

Results by county

See also
 United States presidential elections in New Jersey
 Presidency of Ronald Reagan

References

New Jersey
1984
1984 New Jersey elections